1977 JSL Cup Final was the second final of the JSL Cup competition. The final was played at National Stadium in Tokyo on May 25, 1977. Furukawa Electric won the championship.

Overview
Furukawa Electric won their 1st title, by defeating Yanmar Diesel 4–0.

Match details

See also
1977 JSL Cup

References

JSL Cup
1977 in Japanese football
JEF United Chiba matches
Cerezo Osaka matches